Untold: Deal with the Devil is a 2021 American biographical documentary film made for Netflix and directed by Laura Brownson.

Summary 
The film is the second installment in the nine-part Untold documentary film series. Its story focuses on the career and personal life of former professional boxer Christy Martin, including the acceptance of her lesbian sexuality and violence in her personal life.

References

External links 
 
  Excerpt
 Official trailer

2021 films
2021 documentary films
2021 LGBT-related films
2020s American films
2020s English-language films
American biographical films
American LGBT-related films
American sports documentary films
Biographical documentary films
Documentary films about LGBT sportspeople
Documentary films about sportspeople
Lesbian-related films
Netflix original documentary films